Corey Moore (born January 28, 1993) is a former American football safety. He lettered in football, basketball and track at Griffin High School in Griffin, Georgia. In football, he earned SuperPrep All-American honors and played in the U.S. Army All-American Bowl. He then played college football at Georgia, where he was a four-year letterman. Moore played in 50 games during his college career, recording 76 tackles, one sack, two interceptions and three pass breakups. He signed with the Houston Texans after going undrafted in the 2015 NFL Draft. He played in one game for the Texans in 2015, started eight games in 2016 and started three games in 2017.

Early years
Moore played high school football at Griffin High School in Griffin, Georgia, where he was a safety. He was named to the 2010 PrepStar Top 150 Dream Team. He was also named to the SuperPrep All-America team and the All-Dixie team. He was selected to play in the 2010 Georgia Athletic Coaches Association (GACA) North-South All-Star Football Classic as part of the South Team, and the 2011 U.S. Army All-American Bowl as part of the East Team. Moore was also backup quarterback during his senior year. He lettered in basketball and track at Griffin High School as well. In March 2010, he was named the top defensive back at the Atlanta National Underclassmen Combine.

In the class of 2011, he was rated a four-star recruit by Rivals.com, Scout.com, ESPN.com and 247Sports.com. He was also rated the No. 5 safety in the country by Rivals.com, the No. 6 safety in the country by Scout.com, the No. 15 safety in the country by ESPN.com, and the No. 4 safety in the country by 247Sports.com. He was also rated the No. 6 safety in the country on 247Sports.com's composite rating, which takes into account the ratings of all the other major recruiting services in the country.

College career
Georgia was the first school to offer Moore and he committed to them on January 30, 2010. He later received offers from other schools, some of which included Auburn, Clemson, Memphis, North Carolina, Miami and Tennessee.

Moore played safety and was a four-year letterman for the Georgia Bulldogs of the University of Georgia from 2011 to 2014. He received the Erskine "Erk" Russell Football Scholarship each year from 2011 to 2013.

He played in 12 games his freshman year in 2011, recording one tackle. He also blocked a punt against Coastal Carolina on September 17, 2011. He appeared in 14 games, starting one, his sophomore season in 2012 and totaled 14 tackles, one of which was a tackle for loss. His one start was on offense against Ole Miss. He was named a team captain for the Vanderbilt game. He also won one of the team's Most Improved Player Awards.

Moore played in 12 games, starting seven, in 2013 and accumulated one sack, one interception, one pass breakup and 35 tackles, three of which were tackles for loss. He appeared in 12 games, with six starts, his senior year in 2014 and recorded one interception, two pass breakups and 26 tackles, two of which were tackles for loss.

He appeared in 50 games during his college career and finished with totals of two interceptions, three pass breakups, one sack and 76 tackles, six of which were tackles for loss. He majored in communication studies at Georgia.

Professional career
Moore was rated the 23rd best strong safety in the 2015 NFL Draft by NFLDraftScout.com. Lance Zierlein of NFL.com predicted that Moore would go undrafted and be a priority free agent. Zierlein also stated that Moore was a "Box safety who doesn't have the speed, range or cover skills to be a reliable, NFL back-end defender."

Houston Texans
After going undrafted in the 2015 NFL Draft, Moore signed with the Houston Texans on May 11, 2015. He was released by the team on September 5, he was then signed to the Texans' practice squad on September 8 and ultimately promoted to the active roster on December 29, 2015. He made his NFL debut and only appearance of the regular season on January 3, 2016, against the Jacksonville Jaguars, recording one special teams tackle. He also played in the team's AFC Wildcard game against the Kansas City Chiefs on January 9.

Due to an injury to strong safety Quintin Demps, Moore made his first start on October 16 against the Indianapolis Colts. Moore then started the next two games at strong safety before Demps returned from injury. Leading up to the Week 13 game against the Green Bay Packers on December 4, starting free safety Andre Hal missed the full week of practice with an illness. During the Packers game, Moore started at free safety in place of Hal, who was active but did not play. Moore then started the final four games of the season at free safety while Hal played in the four games, but did not start any. Moore played in 16 games, starting 8, in 2016 and recorded 25 solo tackles, 7 tackle assists and 3 pass deflections. Hal returned as the starter at free safety for the team's Wildcard round playoff game against the Oakland Raiders on January 7. Moore played in, but did not start, the game against the Raiders and recorded one solo tackle, two pass breakups and a fourth quarter interception as the Texans won by a score of 27–14. Due to strong safety Demps having suffered an injury early in the first half  of the Raiders game, Moore started the Divisional round playoff game against the New England Patriots and recorded seven solo tackles, one tackle assist and one pass breakup as the Texans lost by a score of 34–16.

Moore started the first three games of the 2017 season. During the third game against the New England Patriots, Moore dropped an interception and gave up the game-winning touchdown as the Texans lost by a score of 36–33. Marcus Gilchrist then replaced him as starter. Moore suffered a concussion during the fifth game of the season, which caused him to miss the team's next game. During the 15th game of the season, Moore suffered an MCL sprain. He was placed on injured reserve on December 27, 2017. He played in 14 games, starting 3, in 2017 and recorded 20 solo tackles, 7 tackle assists and 1 pass breakup.

On March 8, 2018, Moore signed a one-year contract with the Texans for $630,000. He was waived by the Texans on September 1, 2018.

Indianapolis Colts
On September 2, 2018, Moore was claimed off waivers by the Indianapolis Colts. He recorded his first career interception on quarterback Derek Anderson in a 37-5 win over the Buffalo Bills.

Tampa Bay Vipers
Moore signed with the Tampa Bay Vipers of the XFL before the start of the regular season. He was waived on February 25, 2020.

Ottawa Redblacks
Moore signed with the Ottawa Redblacks of the CFL on March 2, 2020. After the 2020 CFL season was cancelled, Moore was placed on the retired list by the Redblacks on January 12, 2021.

References

External links
College stats

Living people
1993 births
African-American players of American football
Players of American football from Georgia (U.S. state)
People from Griffin, Georgia
American football safeties
Georgia Bulldogs football players
Houston Texans players
Indianapolis Colts players
Tampa Bay Vipers players
Ottawa Redblacks players
21st-century African-American sportspeople